General elections were held in Jamaica on 28 July 1959. The result was a victory for the People's National Party, which won 29 of the 45 seats. Voter turnout was 66.1%.

Results

References

1959 in Jamaica
Elections in Jamaica
Jamaica